The men's discus throw event at the 1993 Summer Universiade was held at the UB Stadium in Buffalo, United States on 15 July 1993.

Medalists

Results

Qualification

Final

References

Athletics at the 1993 Summer Universiade
1993